The Luzon scops owl (Otus longicornis) is an owl endemic to Luzon, Philippines. There are no subspecies.

References

External links

 Luzon scops owl at OwlPages.com
 
 
 
 
 
 

Luzon scops owl
Birds of Luzon
Luzon scops owl
Luzon scops owl